Anglo-Japanese may refer to:
Anglo-Japanese style, a hybrid artistic style
Anglo-Japanese Friendship Treaty (14 October 1854)
Anglo-Japanese Treaty of Amity and Commerce (26 August 1858)
Anglo-Japanese Treaty of Commerce and Navigation (16 July 1894)
Anglo-Japanese Alliance (30 January 1902 – 17 August 1923)

See also
Japan–United Kingdom relations
Japan–British Exhibition (14 May 1910 – 29 October 1910)
Japanese students in the United Kingdom
Japanese community in the United Kingdom